The 2002 Houston Astros season was the 41st season for the Major League Baseball (MLB) franchise in Houston, Texas.

Offseason
December 11, 2001: Gregg Zaun was signed as a free agent with the Houston Astros.

Regular season

Overview
From August 10–24, first baseman Jeff Bagwell produced a season-high 15-game hitting, marking the 12th consecutive season with at least one double-digit hit streak, a club record, and second to Roberto Alomar with 14 among all then-active players.  In September, he batted .343 with 11 multi-hit games.

Standings

National League Central

Record vs. opponents

Roster

Players stats

Batting

Starters by position
Note: Pos = Position; G = Games played; AB = At bats; H = Hits; Avg. = Batting average; HR = Home runs; RBI = Runs batted in

Other batters
Note: G = Games played; AB = At bats; H = Hits; Avg. = Batting average; HR = Home runs; RBI = Runs batted in

Pitching

Starting pitchers 
Note: G = Games pitched; IP = Innings pitched; W = Wins; L = Losses; ERA = Earned run average; SO = Strikeouts

Other pitchers 
Note: G = Games pitched; IP = Innings pitching; W = Wins; L = Losses; ERA = Earned run average; SO = Strikeouts

Relief pitchers 
Note: G = Games pitched; W = Wins; L = Losses; SV = Saves; ERA = Earned run average; SO = Strikeouts

Farm system

References

External links
2002 Houston Astros season at Baseball Reference
Game Logs:
1st Half: Houston Astros Game Log on ESPN.com
2nd Half: Houston Astros Game Log on ESPN.com
Batting Statistics: Houston Astros Batting Stats on ESPN.com
Pitching Statistics: Houston Astros Pitching Stats on ESPN.com

Houston Astros seasons
Houston Astros Season, 2002
2002 in sports in Texas